Publius Vinicius was a Roman senator active during the reigns of Emperors Augustus and Tiberius. He was the son of Marcus Vinicius, consul in 19 BC. 

Vinicius was ordinary consul in AD 2 with Publius Alfenus Varus, and was an imperial legate for Macedonia and Thracia. There he commanded a legion as military tribune under Lucius Calpurnius Piso. Several years after his consulate, Vinicius was proconsular governor of Asia at some point between AD 10 and 15, but probably in AD 10/11.

His son Marcus Vinicius was consul in AD 30 and a second time in the year 45.

References 

1st-century BC Romans
1st-century Romans
Senators of the Roman Empire
Imperial Roman consuls
Roman governors of Macedonia
Roman governors of Thracia
Roman governors of Asia
Vinicii
Year of birth unknown
Year of death unknown